Schwalbach is a river of Hesse, Germany. It is formed in Schwalbach am Taunus at the confluence of the rivers Sauerbornsbach and Waldbach. It is a left tributary of the Sulzbach, into which it flows near Sulzbach.

See also
List of rivers of Hesse

Rivers of Hesse
Rivers of the Taunus
Rivers of Germany